Şefik Yılmaz Dizdar (born 1938) is a Turkish billionaire businessman, one of the owners of LC Waikiki, a Turkish producer and retailer of clothing and homewares, with 700 stores in 34 countries, and annual sales of over $2 billion.

His brother Vahap Kucuk, is the CEO and spokesman of LC Waikiki.

Dizdar is married, and lives in Istanbul, Turkey.

References

1938 births
Living people
Turkish billionaires
20th-century Turkish businesspeople
21st-century Turkish businesspeople